The Jollyville Plateau salamander (Eurycea tonkawae) is a species of salamander in the family Plethodontidae. It is also known as the Tonkawa Springs salamander.
It is endemic to Travis and Williamson counties, Texas, United States.  This species is perrenibranchiate, retaining its gills throughout life.

Eurycea tonkawae is the sister taxon to E. naufragia and E. chisholmensis, two other endemic perrenibranchiate central Texas salamanders.

Its natural habitats are freshwater springs, spring runs, and wet caves of the Buttercup karst system.  Cave dwelling E. tonkawae may represent a distinct species, however further work is needed to clarify their taxonomic status.

Conservation status
Eurycea tonkawae is threatened by habitat loss and habitat degradation due to rapid urban growth. In August, 2013, this species was listed as threatened under the Endangered Species Act of 1973.

Notes

References
  (1993): A new species of perennibranchiate salamander (Eurycea, Plethodontidae) from Austin, Texas. Herpetologica 49: 242–259.
  (2000): Phylogenetic relationships of central Texas hemidactyliine plethodontid salamanders, genus Eurycea, and a taxonomic revision of the group. Herpetological Monographs 14: 1-80.
  (2001): A new species of subterranean blind salamander (Plethodontidae: Hemidactyliini: Eurycea: Typhlomolge) from Austin, Texas, and a systematic revision of central Texas paedomorphic salamanders. Herpetologica 57: 266–280.

External links

Amphibians of the United States
Eurycea
Cave salamanders
Endemic fauna of Texas
Taxonomy articles created by Polbot
ESA threatened species
Amphibians described in 2000